Protelytroptera is an extinct order of insects thought to be a stem group from which the modern  Dermaptera evolved. These insects, which resemble modern Blattodea, or cockroaches, are known from the Permian of North America, Europe and Australia, from the fossils of their shell-like forewings and the large, unequal anal fan. None of their fossils are known from the Triassic, when the morphological changes from Protelytroptera to Dermaptera presumably took place.

References

Polyneoptera
Extinct insect orders
Earwigs
Earwig taxonomy
Permian insects